The wheatears  are passerine birds of the genus Oenanthe. They were formerly considered to be members of the thrush family, Turdidae, but are now more commonly placed in the flycatcher family, Muscicapidae. This is an Old World group, but the northern wheatear has established a foothold in eastern Canada and Greenland and in western Canada and Alaska.

Etymology
The name "wheatear" is not derived from "wheat" or any sense of "ear", but is a folk etymology of "white" and "arse", referring to the prominent white rump found in most species.

The genus name Oenanthe is derived from the Greek oenos (οἶνος) "wine" and anthos (ἄνθος) "flower".  It refers to the northern wheatear's return to Greece in the spring just as the grapevines blossom.

Taxonomy
The genus Oenanthe was introduced by the French ornithologist Louis Jean Pierre Vieillot in 1816 with Oenanthe leucura, the black wheatear, as the type species. The genus formerly included fewer species but molecular phylogenetic studies of birds in the Old World flycatcher family Muscicapidae found that the genus Cercomela was polyphyletic with five species, including the type species C. melanura, phylogenetically nested within the genus Oenanthe. This implied that Cercomela and Oenanthe were synonyms. The genus  Oenanthe (Vieillot, 1816) has taxonomic priority over Cercomela (Bonaparte, 1856) making Cercomela a junior synonym. Nonetheless, Cercomela is considered a valid genus on the Clements Checklist of Birds of the World, managed by the Cornell University Laboratory of Ornithology.

Description
Most species have characteristic black and white or red and white markings on their rumps or their long tails. Most species are strongly sexually dimorphic; only the male has the striking plumage patterns characteristic of the genus, though the females share the white or red rump patches.

Species list

The genus contains 33 species:

Northern wheatear, Oenanthe oenanthe
Atlas wheatear, Oenanthe seebohmi
Capped wheatear, Oenanthe pileata
Buff-breasted wheatear, Oenanthe bottae – formerly the red-breasted wheatear
Rusty-breasted wheatear, Oenanthe frenata – split from O. bottae
Heuglin's wheatear, Oenanthe heuglinii
Isabelline wheatear, Oenanthe isabellina
Hooded wheatear, Oenanthe monacha
Desert wheatear, Oenanthe deserti
Western black-eared wheatear, Oenanthe hispanica
Eastern black-eared wheatear, Oenanthe melanoleuca
Cyprus wheatear, Oenanthe cypriaca
Pied wheatear, Oenanthe pleschanka
White-fronted black chat, Oenanthe albifrons  (formerly in either Pentholaea or Myrmecocichla)
Somali wheatear, Oenanthe phillipsi
Red-rumped wheatear, Oenanthe moesta
Blackstart, Oenanthe melanura (formerly in Cercomela)
Familiar chat, Oenanthe familiaris (formerly in Cercomela)
Brown-tailed rock chat, Oenanthe scotocerca  (formerly in Cercomela)
Sombre rock chat, Oenanthe dubia (formerly in Cercomela)
Brown rock chat, Oenanthe fusca (formerly in Cercomela)
Variable wheatear, Oenanthe picata
Black wheatear, Oenanthe leucura (type species)
Abyssinian wheatear, Oenanthe lugubris
White-crowned wheatear, Oenanthe leucopyga
Hume's wheatear, Oenanthe alboniger
Finsch's wheatear, Oenanthe finschii
Maghreb wheatear, Oenanthe halophila
Mourning wheatear, Oenanthe lugens
Basalt wheatear, Oenanthe warriae
Arabian wheatear, Oenanthe lugentoides
Kurdish wheatear, Oenanthe xanthoprymna
Red-tailed wheatear, Oenanthe chrysopygia

Behaviour
Wheatears are terrestrial insectivorous birds of open, often dry, country. They often nest in rock crevices or disused burrows. Northern species are long-distance migrants, wintering in Africa.

Fossil record
Oenanthe kormosi (Late Miocenee of Polgardi, Hungary)  
Oenanthe pongraczi (Plioceme of Csarnota, Hungary)

References

 
Taxa named by Louis Jean Pierre Vieillot